Jiří Rubáš (5 February 1922 – 16 May 2005) was a Czech football manager and former player.

As a player, Rubáš played mostly for Bohemians Prague. He also played for the Czechoslovakia national team, for which he appeared in six matches between 1949 and 1952.

In 1954 he ended his active career and immediately began working as a football manager at Bohemians Prague. He coached them for 14 years before moving to Baník Ostrava. Rubáš coached several top Czech clubs, including Baník Ostrava, Škoda Plzeň and Sparta Prague. Rubáš was appointed as a new manager of Baník in the half of the 1975–1976 season and led Baník to the surprising title of Czechoslovak champions, for the first time in club's history.

References
  Profile at the ČMFS website
  Největší osobnosti FC Viktoria Plzeň at the Viktoria Plzeň website
  Trenéři v celé historii Sparty at the Sparta Prague website
  Zemřel bývalý hráč a trenér Jiří Rubáš at the Bohemians 1905 website

1922 births
2005 deaths
Czech footballers
Czechoslovak footballers
Czechoslovakia international footballers
FK Viktoria Žižkov players
FC Hradec Králové players
Czech football managers
Czechoslovak football managers
FC Baník Ostrava managers
AC Sparta Prague managers
FK Teplice managers
FC Viktoria Plzeň managers
Association football midfielders
Association football defenders
People from Rokycany
Bohemians 1905 players
Bohemians 1905 managers
Sportspeople from the Plzeň Region